Rolland Lee Romero (August 21, 1914 – November 25, 1975) was an American triple jumper. He was national champion in 1935 and competed in the 1932 and 1936 Summer Olympics.

Biography

Romero was born in Welsh, Louisiana on August 21, 1914. At Welsh High School he played football and competed in a variety of track and field events. From the fall of 1931 he attended Loyola University New Orleans, receiving an athletic scholarship midway through his freshman year; originally, the 120 yard hurdles were his main event, but he dropped it soon due to awkward falls and turned to the triple jump.

Romero developed rapidly; his season best in 1932 was 49 ft  in (15.20 m), the best jump by an American since Dan Ahearn in 1913. At the 1932 United States Olympic Trials he was second behind Sidney Bowman with a jump of 48 ft  in (14.89 m), qualifying for the Olympics in Los Angeles. Romero placed eighth at the Olympics, reaching 14.85 m (48 ft  in) on his best jump; as a 17-year-old, he was the youngest athlete on the American track team.

Romero scored his only national championship title at the 1935 Amateur Athletic Union (AAU) meet, jumping 50 ft  in (15.36 m) and breaking Ahearn's meeting record. He set his personal best, 50 ft  in (15.46 m), in Houston on June 5, 1936.
Romero lost to newcomer Billy Brown at the 1936 AAU meet, but won with 49 ft 9 in (15.16 m) at the Olympic Trials the following week. He qualified for the 1936 Summer Olympics in Berlin, where he jumped 15.08 m (49 ft  in) and placed fifth; he was the best of the Americans.

Romero died on November 25, 1975.

References

1914 births
1975 deaths
People from Welsh, Louisiana
American male triple jumpers
Athletes (track and field) at the 1932 Summer Olympics
Athletes (track and field) at the 1936 Summer Olympics
Olympic track and field athletes of the United States